The Indian locomotive class WM was a class of 2-6-4T tank locomotives used on  broad gauge lines in India from 1942.  A total of 70 of them were delivered new, and another four were converted from existing class WV engines.

The ten prototypes of the WM class, the first 30 production units, and the four WV class locomotives that were later converted to WMs, were built by Vulcan Foundry in Newton-le-Willows, Lancashire, England.  The remaining 30 WM class engines were built by Robert Stephenson and Hawthorns in North East England.

Class table

See also

Rail transport in India#History
Indian Railways
Locomotives of India
Rail transport in India

References

Notes

Bibliography

External links

Railway locomotives introduced in 1942
Robert Stephenson and Hawthorns locomotives
WM
Vulcan Foundry locomotives
2-6-4T locomotives
5 ft 6 in gauge locomotives
Scrapped locomotives